Survivor India is an Indian reality television game show franchise based on the Swedish show Expedition Robinson created in 1997 by Charlie Parsons. It is produced by Banijay India. Subsequently, the show was syndicated internationally and available through Zee5 OTT platforms. Survivor India was originally started in Hindi language in 2012 and it was later adapted by Tamil in 2021 after nearly 10 years later.

Overview 
There are two versions in production. It was first made in Hindi-language in 2012. In 2012, Star India got the rights for producing Survivor India in Hindi and debuted in Star Plus. In 2021, it debuted in Tamil through Zee Tamil.

History

Creation 
Survivor India is a Hindi language adaption of the Swedish show Expedition Robinson. The first season of Survivor India was aired on StarPlus and hosted by Sameer Kochhar.

Expansion 
In early 2021, the show expanded into Tamil being the very first edition in south india and was telecast on Zee Tamil and hosted by Arjun Sarja.

Versions 

  Currently airing – 0
  Upcoming for airing – 0
  Recently concluded – 1
  No longer airing – 1

 Female Winners
 Male Winners

Summary

Survivor India 

Survivor India is the Hindi and the first version of the franchise. The first season was premiered in January 2012 on Star Plus and was hosted by Sameer Kochhar. The prize money for the winner was 1 crore (US$140,000) and the location of the island was in the Caramoan islands in Philippines. In the first season, field hockey player Raj Rani won the season while actor Jamnadas Majethia emerged as the runner up.

Survivor Tamil 

Survivor is the Tamil and the second version in the franchise. Banijay produced the show in 2021 with Arjun Sarja as the host on Zee Tamil. The prize money for title winner was 1 crore (US$140,000) and the location os the island for the first season was in Zanzibar which is located in Tanzania.
The first season was premiered in September 2021. In season 1, actress Vijayalakshmi Feroz won the season while actor Saran Shakthi emerged as the runner up.

References 

Indian reality television series
Indian television series based on non-Indian television series
India
Television series by Banijay